The London Youth Games is an annual multi-sport event held in London, England. The London Youth Games offer competitive opportunities for young people aged 7 to 18 (who live or go to school in London) across approximately 30 sports every year. The London Youth Games are contested between the 32 London boroughs (as well as the City of London) and take place at venues across the capital nine months of the year.

The focal point is finals weekend at the National Sports Centre in Crystal Palace, which traditionally takes place on the first weekend in July. But there are around 50 events that take place annually including qualifying rounds and stand alone finals at venues as prestigious as Lord's, Copper Box Arena and Hampstead Heath. The London Youth Games is free and open to all young people living in or going to school in London.

With around 100,000 young Londoners take part in the London Youth Games each year, it is reckoned to be the largest annual youth sports event in Europe. Notable past participants include four-times Olympic gold medallist Mo Farah, Premier League and England Footballer Raheem Sterling and World and European sprinting gold medallist Dina Asher-Smith.

The London Youth Games is funded mainly via commercial support from headline sponsor Nike, membership contributions from each of the London local authorities and Sport England National Lottery support. The London Youth Games are organised and managed by the London Youth Games Foundation, which is a registered charity (1048705)., representatives from the London boroughs and a number of independent trustees who make up the board of trustees.

The London Youth Games are delivered by a small team of full-time staff, Borough Team Organisers (BTO's) from London's local authorities, School Games Organisers (SGOs), representatives of Sporting National Governing Bodies (NGBs) and around 4,000 volunteers from the London Youth Games volunteering programme GamesForce.

History

Origins 

Ahead of Queen Elizabeth II's Silver Jubilee in 1977, the London Celebrations Committee (LCC) was created to deliver special events in London to mark the occasion. The committee was chaired by Lord Dogheda, and the Vice Chairman was Jeffrey Sterling - now Lord Sterling. Other members included businessman and events organiser Neville Labovitch, theatre impresario Lord Bernard Delfont and sports personality Jimmy Hill.

Hill, a famed figure from football and broadcasting, was made Chair of the Sports Sub Committee responsible for sporting activities and he turned to the Sports Council, of which he was also a member, and the task was assigned to Head of Sports Development for London and South East, Roger Bottomley. After several meetings with colleagues, he came up with two ambitious proposals designed to inspire participation and involve youth in 1977. The first was a Jubilee Sport For All event at Hyde Park, including 20 or more competitive sports including elite events in rowing, canoeing, cycling and show jumping and active public participation.

The second was the London Jubilee Games, a youth multi-sport inter-borough competition involving all of London's boroughs - the blueprint for the event that survives to this day. In order to achieve the ambition, Bottomley successfully persuaded the London Boroughs and Governing Bodies of Sport to support the event and the GLC to provide financial support. Each sport and borough agreed that the Games would support Sports Development programmes and there were a series of local preliminary and selection events held in the lead-up the finals.

There was a strong emphasis on the finals being as big as possible and the Crystal Palace National Sports Centre was chosen as the site. It was the first time the facilities at the stadium, the centre and the surrounding park had been used for a large-scale multi-sport event. The event took place on Saturday 6 and Sunday 7 August and the inaugural sports were athletics, badminton, basketball, cycling, fencing, football, gymnastics, judo, karate, lawn tennis, netball, skiing, squash, swimming and diving, volleyball, and weightlifting. "It is hoped the London Jubilee Games will lay the foundations for similar activities in future years," wrote Jimmy Hill in the event programme.

The weekend was a huge success with thousands taking part. At the closing ceremony in the stadium, the crowd were entertained by displays from the Chinese Dragon Dance troupe before the London Borough of Havering were crowned overall winners and collected the Jubilee Trophy.

1978–1989 

There was no original intention for the London Jubilee Games to be an annual event. But with enthusiasm from the 1977 staging still widespread among leaders in London's local government and the London sport community, it was raised at a meeting of London's Elected Members Committee in 1978 and the task to revive it as the London Youth Games in 1979 was delegated to Anthony Allan CBE, then Chief Executive of Hammersmith and Fulham Council. Allan consulted closely with Roger Bottomley, the driving force behind the first Games in 1977, adopted the original blueprint, and the Crystal Palace National Sports Centre became established as the spiritual home of the event.

The event received full support from all London boroughs as a key component of sports development in each area of London. The sports continued to be delivered by NGBs and included traditional sports like athletics, football, swimming, but also equestrian events, darts and skiing. Olympic swimming gold medallist Duncan Goodhew was a prominent supporter of the London Youth Games during this period.

The Sports Development department at Hammersmith and Fulham Council were responsible for leading on delivery of the Games until the mid 1980s. In 1985, London Youth Games Ltd was created to cater for the growth and complexity of the organisation dedicated to running the London Youth Games. Former Leader of Hackney Council Anthony Kendall OBE began a 30-year association with the Games  with two stints as Chair in 1985-1990 and 2004–2014, with Allan his Vice-Chair. Together, they steered the London Youth Games through some challenging financial times to still deliver a comprehensive London Youth Games every year.

During this time, the London Youth Games began to broaden its programme beyond finals weekend. In 1986, a water sports regatta was introduced at the Royal Albert and Victoria Docks. To celebrate its 10th anniversary, the 1987 London Youth Games featured in cycling's Milk Race and the cross-country championships were introduced to the Games programme.

1990–1999 

In 1994, BAA Heathrow became the first title sponsor of the London Youth Games which were renamed ' The London Heathrow Youth Games '. The sponsorship lasted for over a decade and gave the event financial stability through to the new millennium. The Mini Games event for Londoners under the age of 11 was introduced, taking place on the Thursday before the Weekend Finals, and providing a multi-sport opportunity for thousands of Primary Aged young people. The Indoor Cricket Cup was created in 1996 with the finals at Lord's. A then record 20,000 children took part in the 1998 London Youth Games.

The regatta was revamped in 1999 with the introduction of separate competitions in canoeing, sailing and rowing. The event provided an early experience of competitive sport for many athletes who went on to succeed at the highest level, including multiple Olympic champion Mo Farah, Olympic cycling gold medallist Joanna Rowsell Sand, Olympic 400m gold medallist Christine Ohuruogu, four-times Winter Olympian Chemmy Alcott, and Manchester United and England footballer Rio Ferdinand. Farah finished only 9th in the 1994 cross country under-11s race.

2000–2009 
A four-day national Youth Games final of the winning teams from all 43 Area Youth Games in the UK took place in Southampton in August 2000. London sent two squads to represent the city at  'The BAA Millennium Youth Games'  in the 12 sports competitions.

The Queen, accompanied by her husband, Prince Philip, Duke of Edinburgh, visited the London Youth Games Mini Games at Crystal Palace on 4 July as part of her Golden Jubilee Tour in 2002. She watched a relay race and presented winners' medals. Of her visit, Camden's Borough Team Organiser John Mann said: "Despite the most stringent security measures, as the Queen walked into the main sports hall during the athletics competition she was engulfed by kids who completely overran the bodyguards and minders. They seemed absolutely horrified but she didn't appear at all concerned and seemed to genuinely enjoy the occasion!"

In 2007, long-time Chair and pioneer of women's cycling Eileen Gray CBE stepped down from the board after a 17-year association with the London Youth Games. She was one of the first women to represent Great Britain in cycling, in 1946, and was responsible for women's cycling being introduced to the Olympic programme in 1984.

The 2004 London Youth Games were launched by former boxing champion Michael Watson and showcased the London 2012 Olympics bid during the launch and at the finals weekend. London Youth Games competitor Amber Charles (Newham, girls basketball), then 14, was chosen as a youth ambassador for the ultimately successful bid. Participants greeted the Athens Olympic Flame as it arrived in the UK on its world tour.

Former participant and rising star of British long-distance running Mo Farah lit the games torch at the opening ceremony of the 2007 London Youth Games. Another former participant, Olympic hurdles medallist Tasha Danvers, lit the flame at the 2009 London Youth Games.

BAA Heathrow's sponsorship of the Games ended in 2005 and a new public sector funding secured the London Youth Games' future with long-term funding from Sport England National Lottery and the Greater London Authority. Balfour Beatty announced a six-year association with the London Youth Games in 2006. They signed as a title sponsor until 2013 and the London Youth Games were renamed ' The Balfour Beatty London Youth Games '.

In 2009, the London Youth Games celebrated the 500,000th competitor in its history. The London Youth Games also got its first patron with former competitor, Chicago Bulls and GB basketball captain Luol Deng. GamesForce, the London Youth Games volunteer programme, was launched, offering hundreds of opportunities for young people aged 16–25 to train, gain experience and develop skills in sport, event co-ordination and media through the events programme. The London Youth Games Hall of Fame was launched with six former participants inducted: Steve Backley, Linford Christie, Luol Deng, Christine Ohuruogu, Mark Hunter (rower) and Dervis Konuralp.

2010–2019 

In 2010, the London Youth Games hit a record 50,000 competitors and became the largest annual youth sports event in Europe. Olympic 400m runner Christine Ohuruogu was the 2010 London Youth Games patron and she was joined by the then London Mayor and future UK Prime Minister Boris Johnson to light the flame at the Opening Ceremony for Finals Weekend. Zoe Smith, a Greenwich gymnast who only discovered her talent for weightlifting when asked to make up the team for the London Youth Games, won a bronze medal at the Commonwealth Games in Delhi just three months after representing her borough at the London Youth Games.

2011 was another record year for the London Youth Games, as over 71,000 youngsters competed in 30 sports, with Richmond winning the Jubilee Trophy for the first time. England women's footballer Rachel Yankey was the patron of that year's Games. Also in 2011, the London Youth Games successfully hosted a London School Games pilot event ahead of its official launch the following year.

2012 saw the London Youth Games introduce a whole new raft of schools competitions in line with the national School Games pathway and hosted the inaugural finals at Crystal Palace in March. Hounslow were the victors and took home the Schools Shield. Games alumni Zoe Smith and David Weir were joint patrons for a record-breaking year at the London Youth Games. BMX was introduced to the London Youth Games. In Olympic and Paralympic year, Croydon won the Jubilee Trophy for the first time in 18 years. It was announced later in the year that participation figures for the 2012 Balfour Beatty London Youth Games were 104,463 – a record in the history of the event.

The London Youth Games was well represented at London 2012 with 44 former participants competing in the 2012 Olympics and 2012 Paralympics. London Youth Games alumni contributed 14 medals to Team GB including gold medals for track athletes Mo Farah and David Weir, cyclists Bradley Wiggins and Joanna Rowsell Sand, and rower Naomi Riches.

The London Youth Games celebrated a huge landmark in 2014 with its millionth competitor. A special reception was held at the Houses of Parliament to recognise the London coaches connected with the London Youth Games who had made such a massive contribution to community sports participation across London. In 2015, Dance was introduced to the London Youth Games with the inaugural competition taking place at the Copper Box Arena. Former London Youth Games gymnastics competitor Warren Russell of the Diversity dance troupe was a member of the judging panel.

In 2017, the London Youth Games celebrated its 40th anniversary with its #40stories40years campaign. Then in 2018, the all-time total of London Youth Games participants reached 1.5 million. In 2019, the London Youth Games announced a new partnership with Nike. On the announcement, David Carmont, Vice President for Nike UK and Ireland, said, "We know that young Londoners have an unbeatable spirit and attitude that really sets the tone for this city. But we know that they now need sport in their life more than ever."

2020-present 
For the first time since 1978, the London Youth Games event programme did not take place, due to the pandemic. In response and to help young Londoners stay active, the London Youth Games launched the Virtual Games. Four weeks of sporting challenges set by young Londoners with virtual participation was an innovative undertaking by the organisation. But the response was huge with an incredible 40,522 entries and engagement from all 33 Boroughs. Camden emerged as the Virtual London Youth Games overall winners. In October, the London Youth Games announced the creation of LYG33, a project to empower young Londoners to influence the future of the London Youth Games.

Sports 
The London Youth Games has consisted of multiple sports since its inception. Below is a list of sports that have been included in the London Youth Games at any time since 1977. Those in italics were part of the inaugural London Youth Games in 1977 and those in bold are part of the London Youth Games as of 2020:

 Angling
 Archery
 Aquatic sports
 Diving
 Swimming
 Water polo
 Athletics
 Cross country
 Track and field
 Badminton
 Basketball
 Boccia
 Canoeing
 Polo
 Sprint
 Slalom
 Cricket
 Indoor cricket
 Cycling
 Road
 BMX
 Curling
 New Age Kurling
 Dance
 Darts
 Dragon boat
 Equestrian sports
 Showjumping
 Fencing
  Football
 Golf
 Tri Golf
 Gymnastics
 Artistic gymnastics
 Trampolining
 Handball
 Hockey
 Judo
 Karate
 Netball
 High 5 Netball
 NFL
 Rowing
 Indoor rowing
 Rugby union
 RUGBY LEAGUE
 Rugby sevens
 Tag rugby 
 Sailing
 Skiing
 Squash
 Table tennis
 Tennis
 Triathlon
 Aquathlon
 Volleyball
 Weightlifting

The Jubilee Trophy and Schools Shield 
Every year since its launch in 1977, the Jubilee Trophy has been presented to the overall winning borough and, since 2012, to the winning borough in the Open Games programme. The School Games is scored separately and the overall winning borough in the schools competition is awarded the Schools Shield.  Havering are the most successful borough in the history of the London Youth Games.

Previous Winners

Jubilee Trophy wins by borough

Event Winners

Athletics

Angling

Archery

Badminton

Basketball

Boccia

Canoeing

Cricket

Cycling (Road)

Cycling (BMX)

Diving

Fencing

Football

Gymnastics (Floor and Vault/Artistic)

Hockey

Judo

Karate

Kayak Sprint

Kayak Slalom

Netball

ParaGames Athletics

ParaGames Football

ParaGames Swimming

Swimming

Table Tennis

Tennis (Team)

Trampolining

Triathlon/Aquathon

Volleyball

Weightlifting

Notable participants 
The London Youth Games has been a stepping stone in the careers of many of the UK's most successful sportsmen and sportswomen, plus some who have succeeding outside of competitive sport. Below is a list of notable personalities who have represented their borough at London Youth Games.

Athletics

Jackie Agyepong, Dina Asher-Smith, Steve Backley, Jack Binstead, Julia Bleasdale, Abdul Buhari, Linford Christie, Tasha Danvers, Monique Davis, Tyrone Edgar, Mo Farah, Jo Fenn, Rikki Fifton, Dalton Grant, Desiree Henry, John Herbert, JJ Jegede, Jade Johnson, Jeanette Kwakye, Joice Maduaka, Daryll Neita, Christine Ohuruogu, Tosin Oke, Samson Oni, Scott Overall, Abi Oyepitan, Asha Philip, Kyle Powell, John Regis, Sabrina Sinha, Laura Turner, David Weir, Benedict Whitby, Conrad Williams, Nadia WilliamsBadmintonAamir Ghaffar, Rajiv Ouseph, Charlene White

BasketballOgo Adegboye, Matthew Bryan-Amaning, Steve Bucknall, Arek Deng, Ajou Deng, Luol Deng, Temi Fagbenle, Rosalee Mason, Pops Mensah-Bonsu, Azania Stewart, Andrew SullivanCricketRory Hamilton-Brown, Susie RoweCyclingErick Rowsell, Tao Geoghegan Hart Jo Rowsell, Bradley WigginsDivingTony Ally, Blake Aldridge, Peter WaterfieldFencingJames-Andrew Davis, Richard Kruse, Soji Aiyenuro, Curtis Miller, Laurence HalsteadFootball Chris Bart-Williams, Siobhan Chamberlain, Ashley Cole, Dickson Etuhu, Gavin Hoyte, Jordon Ibe, Justin Hoyte, Ledley King, Eartha Pond, Claire Rafferty, Jadon Sancho Lianne Sanderson, Alex Scott, Danny Shittu, Marvin Sordell, Raheem Sterling, Casey Stoney, Fara Williams, Rachel YankeyGymnasticsChris Bower, Rio Ferdinand, Warren Russell of Diversity (dance troupe)

HockeySophie Bray, Darren Cheesman, Dan ShinglesJudoVictoria Dunn, Gemma Gibbons, Karina Bryant, Winston Gordon, Michelle Holt, Ashley McKenzie, Nekoda Smythe-DavisKayak / CanoeLizzie Broughton, Leanne Brown, Richard Hounslow, Stelian Naftanaila, Lucy Ormorod, Marthe de FerrerKarateRachel NeweyNetballKadeem Corbin, Sasha Corbin, Amanda NewtonRugbyMaggie Alphonsi, Abi Chamberlain, Helen Clayton, Louise Horgan, Katy Storie, Topsy OjoRowingTom Aggar, Ryan Chamberlain, Mark Hunter, Naomi RichesSkiingChemmy Alcott, Aaron TippingSquashPaul Johnson, Dominique Lloyd-Walter, Alison WatersSwimmingElaine Barrett, Ellen Gandy, Dervis Konuralp, Zara Long, Amy Marren, Craig MoateTable TennisDarius KnightTennisAnne KeothavongTriathlonTim Don, Stuart Hayes, Jodie SwallowVolleyballDami Bakare, Peter Bakare, Lucy Boulton, Natasha Brewer, Lizzie Reid, Darius Setsoafia, Yasser Slitti, Nikki StrachanWeightliftingJoanne Calvino, Darren Holloway, Jack Oliver, Zoe Smith, Emily Godley, Mercy Brown''

Other

Hall of Fame 

The London Youth Games Hall of Fame was established in 2009. It is made up of former competitors who have progressed from the London Youth Games to the world stage.

Former 100m champion Linford Christie (Hammersmith and Fulham), 400m champion Christine Ohuruogu (Newham), javelin thrower Steve Backley (Bexley), Chicago Bulls and GB basketball captain Luol Deng (Croydon), rower Mark Hunter (Havering) and Paralympic swimmer Dervis Konuralp (Greenwich) were the first Hall of Fame inductees in 2009 at a prestigious ceremony at Battersea.

From 2010 to 2012, the Hall of Fame evening moved to Lord's Cricket Ground. In 2010, the inductees were 400m hurdler Tasha Danvers (Lambeth and Croydon), long-distance runner Mo Farah (Hounslow), England footballer Rio Ferdinand (Southwark), netball player Amanda Newton (Newham), Paralympic athlete David Weir (Sutton) and cyclist Bradley Wiggins (Camden).

The third group of inductees in 2011 were skier Chemmy Alcott (Richmond), Paralympic swimmer Elaine Barrett (Hackney), triathlete Tim Don (Hounslow), high jumper Dalton Grant (Hackney), squash player Paul Johnson (Greenwich), and footballer Rachel Yankey (Brent).

In 2012 the inductees were cyclist Joanna Rowsell (Sutton), Paralympic rower Naomi Riches (Harrow), judo star Gemma Gibbons (Greenwich), canoeist Richard Hounslow (Harrow), England rugby star Maggie Alphonsi (Enfield) and world champion track star John Regis (Lewisham).

The Hall of Fame evening moved on to BAFTA for 2013 and London 2012 judo bronze medallist Karina Bryant (Kingston), England and Arsenal footballer Alex Scott (Tower Hamlets), fencer Richard Kruse (Barnet), Olympic silver medallist diver Peter Waterfield (Waltham Forest) were all inducted, as well as Darren Hall (Waltham Forest), who is considered by many as the best-ever British badminton player.

At the 2014 Hall of Fame evening, Madame Tussauds played host to the evening and the inductees were basketball trailblazer Steve Bucknall, weightlifting champion Zoe Smith and World Champion swimmer Craig Moate. In 2015, the Hall of Fame moved to Shakespeare's Globe Theatre, and England footballers Siobhan Chamberlain and Lianne Sanderson were among the inductees.

References

External links 
 Official website
 Facebook page
 Twitter page
 YouTube channel

Multi-sport events in the United Kingdom
Annual events in London
1977 establishments in England
Recurring sporting events established in 1977
Youth sport in the United Kingdom
Sport in London